Valérie Michaud (born 12 January 1970) is a retired French professional golfer who played on the Ladies European Tour. She won the 1991 British Ladies Amateur and the 1992 Dutch Ladies Open.

Career
Michaud played for the French national side from 1986 to 1992, including at the 1991 Vagliano Trophy at Nairn Golf Club in Nairn, Scotland. She won the Team gold at the 1991 Mediterranean Games together with Anne Lanzerac and Caroline Boutayre.

Michaud was runner-up at the 1988 Spanish International Ladies Amateur Championship. In 1991 Michaud won the 88th Ladies' British Open Amateur Championship held at Pannal Golf Club in Pannal near Harrogate, North Yorkshire. She beat Wendy Doolan from Australia 3 and 2 in the final.

Michaud turned professional and competed on the Ladies European Tour between 1992 and 2005. She recorded one LET win at the 1992 Dutch Ladies Open, where she outscored Laura Davies by one stroke.

Amateur wins
1988 French Junior Ladies Amateur
1989 Luxembourg Ladies Amateur
1991 British Ladies Amateur, French Ladies Amateur, Italian Ladies Amateur

Source:

Professional wins (1)

Ladies European Tour wins (1)

Team appearances
Amateur
European Ladies' Team Championship (representing France): 1991
Vagliano Trophy (representing Continent of Europe): 1991
Mediterranean Games (representing France):1991

References

External links

French female golfers
Ladies European Tour golfers
Winners of ladies' major amateur golf championships
1970 births
Living people
Mediterranean Games gold medalists for France
Mediterranean Games medalists in golf
Competitors at the 1991 Mediterranean Games
20th-century French women